The combination Allsvenskan and Elitserien was earlier the highest level of bandy in Sweden contested annually between Swedish bandy clubs. The Allsvenskan was split into two regional divisions: the Allsvenskan Norra (north) and the Allsvenskan Södra (south), in which the teams played during the autumn. After the Christmas holiday the Allsvenskan was split into Elitserien (top four teams in each group) and Superallsvenskan (last four teams in each group). The season ended in March with a final on Studenternas IP like the Super Bowl.

Starting with the 2007–08 season, the league structure was remade. Allsvenskan became the name of the second highest level with the national Elitserien as the highest level.

Season structure
Each division contained eight sides. Each team played the other teams in their division twice, one at home the other away. The teams finishing in the top four of each division qualified for the "Elitserien". Teams finishing 5th to 8th in their groups went into the Superallsvenskan.

Teams

The teams for the last season (2006–07) were the following:

Allsvenskan Norra
Bollnäs GIF, Bollnäs
Broberg/Söderhamn Bandy, Söderhamn
Edsbyns IF, Edsbyn
Falu BS, Falun
Ljusdals BK, Ljusdal
Sandvikens AIK, Sandviken
IK Sirius, Uppsala
Tillberga IK, Tillberga

Allsvenskan Södra
BS BolticGöta, Karlstad
Hammarby IF, Stockholm
IFK Motala, Motala
Vetlanda BK, Vetlanda
Villa Lidköping BK, Lidköping
IFK Vänersborg, Vänersborg
Västerås SK, Västerås
Örebro SK, Örebro

Teams by number of seasons

Top goalscorers
Topscorers in the league excluding play-offs

Past seasons
Allsvenskan 2005/06
Allsvenskan 2006/07

References

External links
  svenskbandy
 linkan.dyndyns

Defunct sports competitions in Sweden
Defunct bandy competitions
Bandy leagues in Sweden

de:Bandyallsvenskan
fi:Bandyallsvenskan
sv:Bandyallsvenskan